The 2017 Internationaux de Strasbourg was a professional tennis tournament played on clay courts. It was the 31st edition of the tournament and part of the International-level tournament category of the 2017 WTA Tour. It took place at the Tennis Club de Strasbourg in Strasbourg, France, on 22-28 May 2017.

Points and prize money

Point distribution

Prize money

Singles main draw entrants

Seeds 

 1 Rankings as of May 15, 2017.

Other entrants 
The following players received wildcards into the singles main draw:
  Alizé Cornet
  Amandine Hesse
  Samantha Stosur
  Elena Vesnina

The following players received entry from the qualifying draw:
  Ashleigh Barty
  Julia Boserup
  Madison Brengle
  Camila Giorgi
  Elizaveta Kulichkova
  Vera Lapko

The following player received entry as a lucky loser:
  Çağla Büyükakçay

Withdrawals 
Before the tournament
  Lara Arruabarrena → replaced by  Natalia Vikhlyantseva
  Catherine Bellis → replaced by  Jennifer Brady
  Mirjana Lučić-Baroni → replaced by  Çağla Büyükakçay
  Jeļena Ostapenko → replaced by  Risa Ozaki
  Roberta Vinci → replaced by  Andrea Petkovic

Retirements 
  Caroline Wozniacki

Doubles main draw entrants

Seeds 

1 Rankings as of May 15, 2017.

Champions

Singles 

  Samantha Stosur def.  Daria Gavrilova, 5–7, 6–4, 6–3

Doubles 

  Ashleigh Barty /  Casey Dellacqua def.  Chan Hao-ching /  Chan Yung-jan, 6–4, 6–2

External links 
 Official website

2017 WTA Tour
2017
2017 in French tennis
Internationaux de Strasbourg